Sail Harbor is a census-designated place (CDP) in the towns of New Fairfield and Sherman, Fairfield County, Connecticut, United States. It is in the northeast corner of New Fairfield and the southeast corner of Sherman, on Great Neck and Shelter Harbor, landforms on the west side of Candlewood Lake. It is bordered to the west by Inglenook.

Sail Harbor was first listed as a CDP prior to the 2020 census.

References 

Census-designated places in Fairfield County, Connecticut
Census-designated places in Connecticut